Łodzia may refer to:
Łodzia, Kuyavian-Pomeranian Voivodeship, a village in Poland
Łodzia coat of arms